Marian Leszczyński (8 December 1936 – 31 December 2020) was a Polish rower. He competed in the men's coxed four event at the 1964 Summer Olympics.

References

External links
 

1936 births
2020 deaths
Polish male rowers
Olympic rowers of Poland
Rowers at the 1964 Summer Olympics
Sportspeople from Lviv
People from Lwów Voivodeship